This article uses Eastern name order when mentioning individuals.

 is a 1955 black-and-white Japanese drama film directed by Tasaka Tomotaka. It is based on the novel of the same title by Yuki Shigeko.

The film reached place 7 in Kinema Junpo's Top Ten list of Japanese Films of 1955.

Plot
After having done a good deed in the past for Mr. Kajiki, Hatsu is invited to move from her village in Akita to Tokyo to start working as a maid for his family. She grows close to their youngest son Katsumi, experiencing things that will change her view on life.

Cast
 Hidari Sachiko as Orimoto Hatsu
 Iba Teruo as Kajiki Katsumi
 Sano Shūji as Kajiki Kyohei
 Todoroki Yukiko as Kajiki Umeko
 Tanabe Yasuo as Kajiki Yukio
 Higashiyama Chieko as First Mother
 Takada Toshie as Nomura Hiroko
 Shishido Jō as Wakatsuki
 Hosokawa Chikako as Mrs. Noro

References

External links
 

Japanese black-and-white films
Japanese drama films
1955 drama films
Films based on Japanese novels
Nikkatsu films
Films directed by Tomotaka Tasaka